The Battle of Meretun (or Merton) between a West Saxon army led by King Æthelred and his brother, the future King Alfred the Great, and a Danish army took place on 22 March 871 at an unknown location in Wessex, probably in one of the modern counties of Dorset, Hampshire, or Wiltshire.

The Battle
According to the manuscript C of the Anglo-Saxon Chronicle:
King Æthelred and his brother Alfred fought against the army at Basing, and there the Danes had the victory. And two months later, King Æthelred and his brother Alfred fought against the army at Meretun, and they were in two divisions; and they put both to flight and were victorious far on into the day; and there was a great slaughter on both sides; and the Danes had possession of the battlefield. And Bishop Heahmund was killed there and many important men. And after this battle a great summer army came to Reading. And afterwards, at Easter, King Æthelred died.

The battle is dated by the death of Heahmund, Bishop of Sherborne. His feast day is listed in the English calendar of saints as 22 March, indicating that he died on that date.

Location
Various names and spellings similar to Marton or Meretun have been used for the site of the engagement. The location is unknown, but there are two possibilities based on the location names used in the original text sources. One is in the vicinity of ancient Merdon Castle, which is in Hursley parish near Winchester. The other is the village of Marten in Wiltshire, although there is a similarly named village called Marden, also in Wiltshire.

References

870s conflicts
Battles involving Denmark
Marton 871
Battles involving the Vikings
Military history of Wiltshire
871
9th century in England